The gopher frog (Lithobates capito) is a species of frog in the family Ranidae, endemic to the south-eastern United States. It primarily inhabits the threatened sandhill communities, flatwoods, and scrub in the Atlantic coastal plain, where it is usually found near ponds.

Subspecies
Its two subspecies include the Carolina gopher frog (L. c. capito), and Florida gopher frog (L. c. aesopus). The dusky gopher frog (L. sevosus) had previously been considered a subspecies, but was elevated to species status in 2001.

Conservation status
Its primary threats include loss of habitat and fire suppression. It is entirely dependent upon small vernal pools for its annual reproduction.  These pools in pine flatwoods are being lost to development, and to fire suppression, which allows forests to invade the natural savanna habitat. Hence, prescribed burns and habitat acquisition are considered key management strategies for its survival.

Footnotes

References
  (1983): Phylogeny and biogeography of the Rana pipiens complex: A biochemical evaluation. Systematic Zoology' 32: 132–143.
  (1988): Systematics of the Rana pipiens complex: Puzzle and paradigm. Annual Review of Systematics and Ecology 19: 39–63.
  (2005): Phylogeny of the New World true frogs (Rana). Mol. Phylogenet. Evol. 34(2): 299–314.   PDF fulltext. 
  (2007) Constraints in naming parts of the Tree of Life. Mol. Phylogenet. Evol.'' 42: 331–338.

External links

 Gopher Frogs, Burrows, and Fire: Interactions in the Longleaf Pine Ecosystem - 2009 University of Florida Fact Sheet

Lithobates
Amphibians of North America
Amphibians described in 2006
Taxonomy articles created by Polbot